Alessandro Camisa (born 13 April 1985) is an Italian professional footballer who plays as a defender for  Nardò.

He played 2 seasons (9 games, no goals) in the Serie A for Lecce.

Biography
On 24 August 2012 he was signed by Vicenza. On 31 August 2015 he was sold back to Lecce. On 20 September 2016 he was signed by Serie D club Nardò.

References

External links
 
 AIC profile (data by football.it) 

1985 births
Living people
Italian footballers
Serie A players
Serie B players
U.S. Lecce players
A.S. Sambenedettese players
S.S.D. Varese Calcio players
L.R. Vicenza players
Sportspeople from the Province of Lecce
Association football defenders
Footballers from Apulia
21st-century Italian people